The statistics for Islam in Uruguay estimate a total Muslim population of 1000, representing 0.02 percent of the population.

A significant Muslim population lives in Chuy, near the Brazilian border, as well as Rivera, Artigas and Montevideo.

There are three Islamic centers in Montevideo:

1) Musallah Al Haazimi

2) Egyptian Cultural Islamic Center

3) Islamic Center Uruguay

References

 
Urug
Uruguay